Andrew or Andy Cunningham may refer to:

Andy Cunningham (footballer) (1891–1973), Scottish football player and coach
Andy Cunningham (actor) (1950–2017), English actor
Andrew Cunningham, 1st Viscount Cunningham of Hyndhope (1883–1963), British admiral of the Second World War
Andrew Cunningham (politician) (1910–2010), British politician, jailed for corruption
Andrew Cunningham (CEO), chief executive of Grainger plc
Andrew Chase Cunningham, American civil engineer and fencing master, wrote The Cane as a Weapon

See also
Andrew Cunningham Farm, near Virginia, Illinois, historic building